Paris Cotton (born November 2, 1989) is an American football running back who is currently a free agent. He played college football at Central Michigan University and attended Hialeah High School in Hialeah, Florida. He has also been a member of the Hamilton Tiger-Cats and Winnipeg Blue Bombers of the CFL.

Taking his background from professional athlete to performance coach and celebrity trainer. His  company Principle6 Consulting is based in Miami Florida. The P6 program focuses on  building the body inside out using tailored workouts & diet plans. The program also offers a diverse mental strength building program formatted from the 6 principles Prayer, Preparation, Patience, Performance, Persistence & Prosperity. He attests his success to the building of himself using the six core principles. Utilizing the program to overcome homelessness and become a professional athlete he now uses the program to help others realize their success & becoming the best version of themselves in the process. More information can be found on his social media & website.

College career
Cotton played football for the Central Michigan Chippewas from 2008 to 2011. He finished his career with 1,381 rushing yards and 9 rushing touchdowns.

Professional career

Cotton was rated the 56th best running back in the 2012 NFL Draft by NFLDraftScout.com.

Hamilton Tiger-Cats
Cotton was signed by the CFL's Hamilton Tiger-Cats on April 2, 2013. He was released by the Tiger-Cats on April 23, 2013.

Winnipeg Blue Bombers
Cotton signed with the Winnipeg Blue Bombers of the CFL on April 22, 2014. Cotton began the 2014 regular season as the #2 back behind incumbent Nic Grigsby. Through October, Cotton had 11 rushing attempts for 20 yards. When Grigsby was traded to Hamilton in later that month, Cotton became the starter for the remainder of the season. Starting the last 4 games of the season, Cotton amassed 341 yards on 55 carries (per game average of 85.2 yards on 13.8 carries) with 3 rushing touchdowns. He finished the season with 92 receiving yards from 10 receptions. Cotton began the 2015 CFL season as the Bombers starting running back, leading the team in rushing attempts for the first 7 games of the season. In the middle of August, Paris suffered a broken arm and would miss the remainder of the 2015 season. Cotton finished the season with 56 carries for 268 yards with 1 rushing touchdown. He also contributed in the passing game, catching 14 passes for 151 yards and 1 touchdown. On February 18, the Bomber announced that they had released Cotton.

Calgary Stampeders
Cotton was signed to the Calgary Stampeders' practice roster on September 1, 2016.

Colorado Crush
On January 20, 2017 Cotton signed with the Colorado Crush of the Indoor Football League (IFL).

References

External links
College stats
Winnipeg Blue Bombers bio

Living people
1989 births
American football running backs
Canadian football running backs
Central Michigan Chippewas football players
Hamilton Tiger-Cats players
Winnipeg Blue Bombers players
Calgary Stampeders players
Players of American football from Miami
Hialeah Senior High School alumni
Colorado Crush (IFL) players
Players of Canadian football from Miami